The Helms Pumped Storage Plant is located 50 mi (80 km) east of Fresno, California in the Sierra Nevada Mountain Range's Sierra National Forest. It is a power station that uses Helms Creek canyon on the North Fork of the Kings River for off-river water storage and the pumped-storage hydroelectric method to generate electricity. After being planned in the early 1970s, construction on the plant began in June 1977 and commercial operations began on 30 June 1984. It has an installed capacity of 1,212 MW and is owned by Pacific Gas and Electric Company.

Design and operation
The power plant operates by moving water between an upper and lower reservoir. When energy demand is high, water is released from the upper reservoir to the generating plant and the water is discharged into the lower reservoir. When demand is low (such as at night), water is pumped into the upper reservoir to be used as stored energy at a later time. This is accomplished by pump-generators which serve a dual role: the pumps can reverse for use as generators. The plant can go from a stand still to operational in eight minutes which allows it to meet peak energy demand. It consumes more electricity pumping than generating electricity but pumping occurs during periods of low demand with unused surplus energy available at lower costs from the electric grid.

The underground power station is near Wishon Reservoir and houses three 404 MW Francis pump turbine-generators.

The Helms Pumped Storage project was designed to be used with the Diablo Canyon Nuclear Power Plant, also owned by PG&E, in the 1970s, when Diablo Canyon was being designed and permitted. It is connected to that power plant by a dedicated high-tension power line.

See also

List of pumped-storage hydroelectric power stations

References

External links
Helms: Power from Water, Human Engineering - PG&E video on the plant's operation

Energy infrastructure completed in 1984
Hydroelectric power plants in California
Pumped-storage hydroelectric power stations in the United States
Buildings and structures in Fresno County, California
Sierra National Forest
Pacific Gas and Electric Company
Dams completed in 1984
Underground power stations
1984 establishments in California